Resistance is a 2020 biographical drama film written and directed by Jonathan Jakubowicz, inspired by the life of Marcel Marceau. It stars Jesse Eisenberg as Marceau, with Clémence Poésy, Matthias Schweighöfer, Alicia von Rittberg, Félix Moati, Géza Röhrig, Karl Markovics, Vica Kerekes, Bella Ramsey, Ed Harris and Édgar Ramírez.

It was released in the United States on March 27, 2020, by IFC Films. Due to the COVID-19 pandemic, only a few independent and drive-in theaters remained open, and so Resistance topped the weekend box office in its opening weekend by earning $2,490 on one screen.

Plot
The film opens in Munich, Nazi Germany. It is 1938 and Nazi Brown Shirts invade the home of a young Jewish girl, Elsbeth, and kill her parents.

The film continues in Strasbourg, France (near the German border), where Marcel Marceau works unfulfilled in his father's butcher shop, disconnected from Nazi atrocities and eager for the arts, especially mime and painting. During 1939, as Nazi power consolidates and World War II approaches, Marceau performs a cabaret impression of Charlie Chaplin, using the narrow moustache also favoured by Adolf Hitler. Visual similarities between Chaplin and Hitler frequent the film. Marceau's passion for theatre strengthens further after discovering his father secretly performs opera.  

While Marcel's cousin, Georges, involves himself with a Jewish arm of the French Resistance, Marcel and Emma fall in love. Marcel's father, who had fled Poland years earlier, supports his son and Emma joining the anti-Nazi resistance. It is a decision that defines Marceau's wartime experiences and brings tragic consequences for Marceau's father: arrested in 1944 he dies in Auschwitz during 1945. 

A Scout troop which Emma and Georges lead rescues 123 Jewish children whose parents were killed by Nazis. Marceau's mime skills improve as he helps entertain the orphans in a nearby castle. Bonds with Emma also strengthen. After Germany invades Poland in autumn 1939 their involvement deepens with the French Resistance. Adults distribute the Jewish children into smaller groups to minimise their visibility, some to local churches and others to Jewish families. Marcel and Emma maintain contact with Elsbeth.  

After 1941 Marceau's story intertwines with the menacing Klaus Barbie, who is seen beating to death a Nazi homosexual in Berlin. Barbie portrays the murder as Aryan purification. Barbie arrives in Lyon in 1942 during the Nazi occupation of southern France. His aim is eliminating the French resistance. Barbie operates by bribing collaborators and brutal executions in an empty swimming pool at Gestapo Headquarters. Later, Barbie gains notoriety as "The Butcher of Lyon".

Marcel and Emma also move to Lyon, with Alain, who narrowly evades capture during a Nazi sweep of Lyon's train station. Marcel helps Alain escape by burning a German soldier. Emma and Mila, her sister, are less fortunate. Captured during another Gestapo roundup, Barbie tortures Mila to death while extracting information from Emma about the resistance. Emma survives by collaboration but later attempts suicide-by-train. Marceau saves her and they resolve to help Jewish children escape to Switzerland.

Pretending their Scout troop is hiking, Marcel and Emma, accompanied by Alain plus a dozen children including Elsbeth, travel by SNCF train to the French Alps. Barbie and SS troops patrol the last train station before the Franco-Swiss border, forcing the petrified Emma into hiding as they search the train. Barbie fails to discover Emma or the children's true ambition to reach Switzerland. Marcel and Emma continue their journey towards Switzerland with the children.

Barbie's SS meanwhile learn from a tortured priest the children are escaping Jews. Barbie, angry at his mistake, mobilises SS troops to pursue Marceau and the children into the icy forests of the Swiss border. Barbie gets close enough to discharge his handgun, mortally wounding Emma, but cannot prevent their escape. Marcel is devastated at Emma's death but comforted the children reach Switzerland.  

The film closes in 1945 at Nuremberg, Germany. Marceau is now a Liaison Officer with the United States Army, also an actor, entertaining troops of the American occupation of Germany. Introduced by General George S. Patton, troops learn that Marceau crossed the Alps many times to save hundreds of children, mostly orphans, and indirectly saved thousands more children. Patton lauds an "incredible story... of one of those unique human beings that makes your sacrifices and your heroism completely worth it."  The film closes with an evocative mime by Marceau in his famous white face and blue and white shirt. It ends with a series of "where are they now" captions that neglects saying that Barbi escaped to Bolivia aided by US intelligence.

Cast
 Jesse Eisenberg as Marcel Marceau, an aspiring mime artist who fought for the French Jewish Resistance
 Kue Lawrence as young Marcel
 Clémence Poésy as Emma
 Félix Moati as Alain Mangel, Marcel's brother, a guard at the French-German border crossing not far from the city of Strasbourg.
 Vica Kerekes as Mila
 Matthias Schweighöfer as Klaus Barbie, a ruthless Gestapo agent
 Géza Röhrig as Georges Loinger, Marceau's cousin and member of the French Jewish Resistance
 Ed Harris as George S. Patton, US Army general and commander of the 7th Army
 Bella Ramsey as Elsbeth
 Martha Issová as Flora
 Karl Markovics as Charles Mangel
  as Max Rheinemert
 Alex Fondja as Frederique
 Aurélie Bancilhon as Dominique
 Alicia von Rittberg as Regine 
 Louise Morell as Marcel's Mother
 Wolfgang Ceczor as Old Man on Train
 Philip Lenkowsky as Father Montluc
 Édgar Ramírez as Sigmund (Elsbeth's Father)
 Klára Issová as Judith (Elsbeth's Mother)
  as Vichy Officer
 Felicity Montagu Mrs. Garner (Emma's Mother)
  as Swiss Hunter
 Maxim Boubin as Joseph on the Tree
 Tobias Gareth Elman as Joseph (older)

Production
In May 2017, it was announced Jesse Eisenberg had joined the cast of the film, portraying the role of Marcel Marceau, during his days as a member of the French Resistance, with Jonathan Jakubowicz directing from a screenplay he wrote. In February 2018, it was announced Haley Bennett and Matthias Schweighöfer had joined the cast of the film, with Warner Bros. Pictures distributing in Germany. In November 2018, Ed Harris, Edgar Ramirez, Clémence Poésy, Bella Ramsey, Géza Röhrig, Karl Markovics and Félix Moati joined the cast of the film, with Poésy replacing Bennett.

An important part of Jesse Eisenberg's preparation for the role of Marcel Marceau was learning mime. He trained for several months with mime artist, movement coach, and mime coach Lorin Eric Salm, who had studied with Marceau at his Paris school and is a historian of Marceau's work. Salm also choreographed the mime scenes for the film, creating original mime pieces based on Marceau's technique and style.

Release
Rocket Science handled international distribution rights. In November 2019, IFC Films acquired distribution rights to the film. It was released on March 27, 2020. The film was set to have a theatrical release, however due to the COVID-19 pandemic IFC released the film on video on demand instead. It was tied for the highest-grossing film in America when it debuted in the week of April 17, 2020, grossing $2,490.

Critical reception
On review aggregator website Rotten Tomatoes, the film holds an approval rating of 56% based on 94 reviews, with an average of 5.7/10. The site's critical consensus reads: "Flawed yet honorable, Resistance pushes past uneven performances and execution to pay sincere tribute to its real-life protagonist."  On Metacritic, the film has a weighted average score of 53 out of 100, based on 19 critics, indicating "mixed or average reviews".

John DeFore of The Hollywood Reporter gave the film a positive review, calling it an "involving if imperfect look at humanism amidst atrocity." Peter Travers of Rolling Stone also gave the film a positive review, writing: "Playing the iconic mime Marcel Marceau in his early days as a French Resistance fighter for Jewish children, Eisenberg acts with physical finesse and deep feeling, proving that the power of art can literally be a saving grace." Michael Nordine of TheWrap praised Eisenberg's performance writing: "His best work comes at the mime's first real public performance, where he dons the white makeup and silently mimes his way through the war itself: Without a single word, he articulates the film's point more movingly than any monologue ever could."

David Ehrlich of IndieWire gave the film a negative review writing: "Resistance can't stop finding new reasons to ignore its protagonist, or flatten him into anonymity, Eisenberg's performance is the giddy standout of a bizarre and half-baked Holocaust thriller that's otherwise absent any sense of self". Jeannette Catsoulis of The New York Times also gave the film a negative review, saying that "Resistance feels disjointed and dated."

References

Further reading 
Eisenberg, Jesse, and Lorin Eric Salm (June 2020). "From Silent Stage to Silver Screen: Bringing Marcel Marceau’s Mime to Resistance". Movement Coach and Mime Coach Lorin Eric Salm. Retrieved February 4, 2021.

External links

2020 films
English-language German films
2020 biographical drama films
American biographical drama films
British biographical drama films
German biographical drama films
Biographical films about actors
Cultural depictions of actors
Films shot in Prague
Films about Nazi Germany
American World War II films
British World War II films
World War II films based on actual events
IFC Films films
Warner Bros. films
2020s English-language films
2020s American films
2020s British films